John Ziegler may refer to:

 John Ziegler (guitarist) Pigmy Love Circus, Volto!
 John Bosley Ziegler (died 1983), physician
 John Ziegler (talk show host) (born 1967), talk show host
 John G. Ziegler (1909–1997), American control engineer
 John Ziegler Jr. (1934–2018), American lawyer and ice hockey executive

See also
 Ziegler